Galveston is a city in the U.S. state of Texas.

Galveston may also refer to:

Places in the United States 
Galveston, Indiana, a town located in the state of Indiana
Galveston Bay, a large estuary located along Texas's upper coast
Galveston Bay Area, a loosely defined region in the southeast portion of Greater Houston
Galveston Causeway, a bridge in Galveston, Texas
Galveston County, a county located along the Gulf Coast region in the U.S. state of Texas
 Galveston, Virginia

Arts, entertainment, and media

Literature
Galveston (Quarrington novel), a 2004 novel by  Paul Quarrington
Galveston, a novel by Nic Pizzolatto
Galveston, a World Fantasy Award-winning novel by Sean Stewart

Music
Galveston (album), a 1969 album by Glen Campbell
"Galveston" (song), a song released in 1969 by Glen Campbell
"Galveston", a song by Janis Ian from the 1969 album Who Really Cares

Other arts, entertainment, and media
Galveston (film), a 2018 film directed by Mélanie Laurent
 The Galveston Empire, the main antagonist in the Japanese anime series Armored Fleet Dairugger XV

Transportation and craft
Galveston–Houston Electric Railway
Galveston-class cruiser, a Navy ship used during World War II

Other uses
Galveston College, a comprehensive community college located on Galveston Island in Galveston, Texas

See also
 Galveztown (disambiguation)